The Pioneer River is a river located in North Queensland, Australia.

History 
Captain John Mackay and his party were the first Europeans to discover the river in 1860. Mackay named it Mackay River after his father, George Mackay of Uralla in New South Wales.

Location and features
The river flows in a northerly direction into the  Pioneer Valley. At  the river flows to the east before reaching its mouth and emptying into the Coral Sea at Mackay. The river is joined by ten tributaries including Cattle Creek, Queensland (North Burnett Region) and Blacks Creek. The river is too shallow for navigation, drying sandbanks encountered only a few kilometres upstream of the river mouth.

Upper parts of the catchment are too steep for agriculture and remain covered by rainforests and open woodlands. In 2002, a Queensland Government report found that the local sugar industry had allowed five pesticides to enter the river, exceeding acceptable standards.

The river has a number of water storage facilities built along its course including Teemburra Dam, Dumbleton Weir, Mirani Weir and Marian Weir. It is crossed by the Bruce Highway and the North Coast railway line in Mackay.

The river is crossed by the  Forgan Bridge at Mackay.

Pioneer Valley
The Pioneer Valley is one of Australia's richest sugar cane areas. It runs for about 45 km from Netherdale in the west to Marian in the east. For much of its length it is drained by Cattle Creek, until that creek joins the Pioneer River near Benholme. The valley contains important sugar mills and contains linked railway lines as far west as Pinnacle.

In September 2022, the Queensland State Government's Premier, Annastacia Palaszczuk, announced a proposed pumped-storage hydroelectricity scheme that will involve flooding some land of the valley.

Flooding
This height was reached after extremely heavy rain fell over Mackay ( in 6  hours). After the devastating Mackay cyclone of 21 January 1918, the river was flooded for weeks. The Pioneer has reached major flood levels on twenty occasions since records first began in 1884, with the highest reaching  in 1958.

See also

Rivers of Queensland

References

External links 
 Map of the Pioneer River from Australia's Bureau of Meteorology (BOM)

Rivers of Queensland
North Queensland
Bodies of water of the Coral Sea
Mackay, Queensland